The 2020–21 Rutgers Scarlet Knights women's basketball team represented Rutgers University during the 2020–21 NCAA Division I women's basketball season. The Scarlet Knights, led by 26th year head coach C. Vivian Stringer, played their home games at the Louis Brown Athletic Center, better known as The RAC, as a member of the Big Ten Conference.

They finished the season 14–5, 10–3 in Big Ten play to finish in third place.  They received a double-bye into the Quarterfinals of the Big Ten women's tournament when they lost to Iowa.  They received an at-large bid to the NCAA tournament.  As the six seed in the Mercado Regional they lost to BYU in the First Round to end their season.

Previous season 

The Scarlet Knights finished the season 22–8, 11–7 in Big Ten play to finish in fifth place. They advanced to the quarterfinals of the Big Ten women's tournament where they lost to Indiana. They did not get a chance for further post season play, as the NCAA women's basketball tournament and WNIT were cancelled before they began due to the COVID-19 pandemic.

Roster

Schedule

|-
!colspan=6 style=| Regular season

|-
!colspan=6 style=| Big Ten Women's Tournament

|-
!colspan=6 style=| NCAA tournament

Rankings

The Coaches Poll did not release a Week 2 poll and the AP Poll did not release a poll after the NCAA Tournament.

See also
2020–21 Rutgers Scarlet Knights men's basketball team

References 

Rutgers Scarlet Knights women's basketball seasons
Rutgers
Rutgers
Rutgers
Rutgers